The Men's 50 metre butterfly competition at the 2017 World Championships was held on 23 and 24 July 2017.

Records
Prior to the competition, the existing world and championship records were as follows.

Results

Heats
The heats were held on 23 July at 10:33.

Semifinals
The semifinals were held on 23 July at 17:53.

Semifinal 1

Semifinal 2

Final
The final was held on 24 July at 18:17.

References

Men's 50 metre butterfly